Beirut Digital District (BDD) is a built community dedicated to creating a hub for the digital and creative industries in Lebanon. It was officially launched in September 2012 in the Bachoura district of Beirut as a government facilitated project established between ZRE s.a.l. (a private real-estate company), Berytech (an incubator accelerator for the development of startups in the ICT field), and The Ministry of Telecommunications, who acted as a facilitator and provided broadband internet and telephone infrastructure.
CNN’s Andrew Stevens called BDD the powerhouse for startups in the Middle East.

Location 
Beirut Digital District is located in the Bachoura district, the center of Beirut City, Lebanon. BDD is in close proximity to the airport and seaport, about 5 minutes away from downtown, and minutes away from American University of Beirut, Lebanese American University, Saint Joseph University, École Supérieure des Affaires, and Sagesse University.

Facilities 
There are multiple amenities and services provided by Beirut Digital District:
 Conference and meeting rooms and audio-conference rooms 
 Events and workshop spaces
 Gym and fitness classes
 Eatery and coffee shop 
 Fiber optics and Wi-Fi
 Parking spaces and valet services
 HR services
 Business and legal setup services

Phases 
The development of Beirut Digital District has been separated into 4 phases:

Phase A 

The first phase was completed in 2016. In this phase, the total build up area of BDD is 17,500 square meters dedicated to office spaces.

Phase B 

This phase is due completion in 2020 where BDD will become a 44,500 square meter district dedicated to office spaces.

Phase C 

This phase makes BDD an 84,000 square meter district dedicated to office spaces and residential units and is due completion in 2025.

Phase D 

The last phase, to be completed in 2030, will transform BDD into a 150,000 square meter district with multiple offices and residential units.

References

Beirut